Nicholas Slake  was the Dean of Wells during 1398.

Career

He was appointed:
Prebendary of Erdington in Bridgnorth 1394
Prebendary of Shirecote in Tamworth
Prebendary of Wenlocksbarn in St Paul's Cathedral 1394 - 1395
Prebendary of Brightling in Hastings 1394
Prebendary of York 1396
Dean of St Stephen's Chapel, Westminster 1396
Dean of Wells 1396
Rector of St Mary Abchurch 1398
Archdeacon of Wells 1398

He was appointed to the fifth stall in St George's Chapel, Windsor Castle in 1382, a position he held until 1394.

References

Deans of Wells
Canons of Windsor
Archdeacons of Wells
Deans of St Stephen's Chapel, Westminster